Catalonia is (as of 2018) divided into 947 municipalities.

Each municipality typically represents one significant urban settlement, of any size from village to city, with its surrounding land. This is not always the case, though. Many municipalities have merged as a result of rural depopulation or simply for greater efficiency. Some large urban areas, for example Barcelona, consist of more than one municipality, each of which previously held a separate settlement. The Catalan government encourages mergers of very small municipalities; its "Report on the revision of Catalonia's territorial organisation model" (the ""), published in 2000 but not yet implemented, recommends many such mergers. 

Larger municipalities may sometimes grant the status of decentralised municipal entity to one or more of its settlements, for more effective provision of services or to substitute for its previous status as a separate municipality.

Each municipality is run by a council elected by the residents at periodic nationwide local elections. The council consists of a number of members depending on population, who elect the mayor. The town hall is located in the main settlement, and deals with provision of local services and administrative matters such as registration of residents. The "main settlement" is not always the biggest settlement, as new urban developments such as tourist resorts can become very big very quickly without achieving any political recognition.

Boundaries between municipalities have their origins in ancient landholdings and transfers, and may often appear quite arbitrary and illogical, with exclaves common.

Catalonia's municipalities are (as of 1987) grouped into 42 comarques (by the Catalan government) and four provinces (by the Spanish government). Occasional revisions of the boundaries of comarcas have resulted in municipalities moving from one comarca to another; see the list at Comarques of Catalonia.

List of municipalities

The official names in Catalan are the only legal ones (except in the Val d'Aran). Older texts may use Spanish forms or spellings.

References and notes

External links
 

Catalonia-related lists